
Gmina Żukowice is a rural gmina (administrative district) in Głogów County, Lower Silesian Voivodeship, in south-western Poland.

Neighbouring gminas
Gmina Żukowice is bordered by the town of Głogów and by the gminas of Bytom Odrzański, Gaworzyce, Głogów, Jerzmanowa, Kotla, Radwanice and Siedlisko.

Villages
The gmina contains the villages of Brzeg Głogowski, Bukwica, Czerna, Dankowice, Dobrzejowice, Domaniowice, Glinica, Kamiona, Kłoda, Kromolin, Nielubia, Słone, Szczepów, Zabłocie and Żukowice.

References

Zukowice
Głogów County